Aye Thein Rakhaine (born 16 July 1962) is a Bangladeshi academic and politician from Cox's Bazar belonging to Bangladesh Awami League. She is a former member of the Jatiya Sangsad.

Biography
Rakhaine was born on 16 July 1962. In 1971 she nursed the injured freedom fighters during the Liberation War of Bangladesh. She also worked as an organizer during the Liberation War of Bangladesh.

After receiving post graduate degree Rakhaine started her career. She taught in college. She was elected as a member of the Jatiya Sangsad from Reserved Women's Seat-30 in 1996 and served till 2001. Later, she was elected as a member of the Jatiya Sangsad from Reserved Women's Seat-7 in 2009.

References

1962 births
Living people
Marma people
Bangladeshi Buddhists
People from Cox's Bazar District
Bangladeshi academics
7th Jatiya Sangsad members
9th Jatiya Sangsad members
People of the Bangladesh Liberation War
Awami League politicians
Women members of the Jatiya Sangsad
21st-century Bangladeshi women politicians